Retroactive continuity, or retcon for short, is a literary device in which facts in the world of a fictional work which have been established through the narrative itself are adjusted, ignored, supplemented, or contradicted by a subsequently published work which recontextualizes or breaks continuity with the former.

There are various motivations for applying retroactive continuity, including:
 To accommodate desired aspects of sequels or derivative works which would otherwise be ruled out.
 To respond to negative fan reception of previous stories.
 To correct and overcome errors or problems identified in the prior work since its publication.
 To change or clarify how the prior work should be interpreted.
 To match reality, when assumptions or projections of the future are later proven wrong.

Retcons are used by authors to increase their creative freedom, on the assumption that the changes are unimportant to the audience compared to the new story which can be told. Retcons can be diegetic or nondiegetic. For instance, by using time travel or parallel universes, an author may diegetically reintroduce a popular character they had previously killed off. More subtle and nondiegetic methods would be ignoring or expunging minor plot points to remove narrative elements the author doesn't have interest in writing.

Retcons are common in pulp fiction, and especially in comic books published by long-established publishers such as DC and Marvel. The long history of popular titles and the number of writers who contribute stories can often create situations that demand clarification or revision. Retcons also often appear in manga, soap operas, serial dramas, movie sequels, cartoons, professional wrestling angles, video games, radio series, and other forms of serial fiction.

Origins
An early published use of the phrase "retroactive continuity" is found in theologian E. Frank Tupper's 1973 book The Theology of Wolfhart Pannenberg: "Pannenberg's conception of retroactive continuity ultimately means that history flows fundamentally from the future into the past, that the future is not basically a product of the past."

A printed use of "retroactive continuity" referring to the altering of history in a fictional work is in All-Star Squadron #18 (February 1983) from DC Comics. The series was set on DC's Earth-Two, an alternate universe in which Golden Age comic characters age in real time. All-Star Squadron was set during World War II on Earth-Two; as it was in the past of an alternate universe, all its events had repercussions on the contemporary continuity of the DC multiverse. Each issue changed the history of the fictional world in which it was set. In the letters column, a reader remarked that the comic "must make you [the creators] feel at times as if you're painting yourself into a corner", and, "Your matching of Golden Age comics history with new plotlines has been an artistic (and I hope financial!) success." Writer Roy Thomas responded, "we like to think that an enthusiastic ALL-STAR booster at one of Adam Malin's Creation Conventions in San Diego came up with the best name for it a few months back: 'Retroactive Continuity'. Has kind of a ring to it, don't you think?"

Types

Alteration
Retcons sometimes add information that seemingly contradicts previous information. This frequently takes the form of a character who was shown to have died but is later revealed to have somehow survived.  This is a common practice in horror films, which may end with the death of a monster that goes on to appear in one or more sequels. The technique is so common in superhero comics that the term "comic book death" has been coined for it.

An early example of this type of retcon is the return of Sherlock Holmes, whom writer Arthur Conan Doyle apparently killed off in "The Final Problem" in 1893, only to bring him back, in large part because of readers' responses, with "The Empty House" in 1903.

The TV series Dallas annulled its entire Season 9 as just the dream of another character, Pam Ewing. Writers did this to offer a supposedly plausible reason for the major character of Bobby Ewing, who had died onscreen at the end of Season 8, to be still alive when actor Patrick Duffy wanted to return to the series. This season is sometimes referred to as the "Dream Season" and was referred to humorously in later TV series such as Family Guy. Other series such as St. Elsewhere, Newhart, and Roseanne would notably employ the same technique.

Subtraction
A notable example of subtractive retconning is the X-Men film series. The film X-Men: Days of Future Past features the character Wolverine traveling in time to 1973 to prevent an assassination that, if carried out, would lead to planetary extinction.

Retcons done to eliminate plotholes 

Some retcons may be done to eliminate what is considered a plothole within a franchise. An infamous example of this are the poorly received retcons of the Star Wars canon in the Star Wars sequel trilogy film, Star Wars: The Last Jedi established Rey as the daughter of “no ones”. However, the sequel The Rise of Skywalker revealed that the scavenger turned Jedi, Rey as the granddaughter of Darth Sidious of the Palpatine family, the character was also resurrected despite being dead for 30 years since Return of the Jedi, and secretly built a new Empire with the help of Sith cultists. Though the means of Palpatine's return to life were negatively criticized for never being revealed in the movie itself, only in tie-in books is described as having transferred his essence into an imperfect clone of himself, leading to a negative reception towards the retcon due to not being explained in the film itself. The characters of Boba Fett and Darth Maul were also revived though those were better received than Palpatine's return. The Rogue One retcon of the Death Star weakness as deliberate sabotage from its creator was well received.

Related concepts
Retroactive continuity is similar to, but not the same as, plot inconsistencies introduced accidentally or through lack of concern for continuity; retconning, by comparison, is done deliberately. For example, the ongoing continuity contradictions on episodic TV series such as The Simpsons (in which the timeline of the family's history must be continually shifted forward to explain why they are not getting any older) reflects intentionally lost continuity, not genuine retcons. However, in series with generally tight continuity, retcons are sometimes created after the fact to explain continuity errors. Such was the case in The Flintstones, where Wilma Flintstone was mistakenly given two separate maiden names, "Pebble" and "Slaghoople", over the course of the series.

See also

 Revisionism (fictional)
 Historical revisionism
 Pseudohistory
 Retronym

Notes

References

External links

1973 neologisms
Continuity (fiction)
Narrative techniques